Alfred Oldham (16 October 1899 – 26 September 1972) was an Australian rules footballer who played for the Melbourne Football Club in the Victorian Football League (VFL).

Notes

External links 

 

1899 births
1972 deaths
Australian rules footballers from Tasmania
Melbourne Football Club players
Launceston Football Club players